Mariano Puerta was the defending champion, but lost in the second round to Albert Costa.

Arnaud Di Pasquale won the title by defeating Alberto Berasategui 6–1, 6–3 in the final.

Seeds

Draw

Finals

Top half

Bottom half

References

External links
 Official results archive (ATP)
 Official results archive (ITF)

Campionati Internazionali di Sicilia
1999 ATP Tour
Camp